"Thank God, It's Doomsday" is the nineteenth episode of the sixteenth season of the American animated television series The Simpsons. It first aired on the Fox network in the United States on May 8, 2005. Al Jean claims that the recorded commentary for this episode was the last time he saw Don Payne, the writer credited for the episode.

Plot
Marge tries to get the kids hair cuts, but is stopped when Homer takes them to get haircuts at a new barbershop in the mall. The kids' haircuts are done so badly, that they hide with Homer in a movie theater showing the film Left Below, a parody of Left Behind: The Movie. In response to the kids losing their hair, Marge later makes them wigs using the leftover hair trimmings. Homer now fears that the Rapture will soon be coming. Despite being consoled by Marge and Lisa (who think God would not end the world unless He announced it), Homer encounters signs suggestive of the Rapture. He uses numerology to calculate the date and time of the Rapture and concludes that it is only a week away.
 
Homer predicts that "stars will fall from the sky", then a blimp accident at the Krusty Celebrity Salute to Specials causes some celebrities (or "stars") to fall to their deaths. His prophecy causes many of Springfield's residents to believe that the world will end and they go with him to the Springfield Mesa to wait for the Rapture. The hour passes without incident, and the people go home. All of them are annoyed at Homer, particularly Moe, who had sold his tavern to be converted to a Japanese sushi bar. Homer goes home and realizes that he has made an error in his calculation, so he returns to the Mesa with no support after getting ostracized by his family. Suddenly, he finds himself naked and ascending into Heaven.

Homer arrives in Heaven, where he is greeted by the tour guide who shows him around. He is then shown to his room where he requests to see his family on the big TV screen in his room. Marge and the children are shown being tormented by the devil. He has a talk with God about saving his family. When God refuses to help, due to Jesus' suffering on Earth, Homer becomes angry. He runs around vandalizing Heaven and gets stopped by security. God finally agrees to undo the Rapture by turning back time. Homer later wakes up on the mesa and is reunited with his family, also discovering Moe's Tavern to curiously be back in its normal set up.

Reception
Don Payne was nominated for a Writers Guild of America Award for Outstanding Writing in Animation at the 58th Writers Guild of America Awards for his script to this episode.

Cultural references
The title is a reference to the popular saying "thank God it's Friday".
The "Left Below" film watched by Homer, Bart and Lisa is a pastiche of the Left Behind franchise.
Homer says that the movie Cannonball Run 2 haunted him for the rest of his life.
In the final scene, Homer, his fellow bar patrons, and Moe form a tableau of The Last Supper.

References

External links
 

2005 American television episodes
The Simpsons (season 16) episodes
Fiction about the Devil
Fiction about God